Lupo Martini Wolfsburg is a German association football club from the city of Wolfsburg, Lower Saxony. The club's greatest success has been promotion to the tier four Regionalliga Nord in 2015–16.

The original club, Sportclub Lupo, was formed in 1962 by Italian migrant workers (German: Gastarbeiter) at the Volkswagen factory in Wolfsburg, and merged in 1981 with another Italian migrant worker club, US Martini, to form the current club. Lupo is the Italian word for wolf, in reference to the city's name, Wolfsburg. While originally formed by Italian nationals, the club nowadays has a more diverse membership base, with more than 50% made up by non-Italians.

History
ISC Lupo was formed in 1962 with the help of the social department of Volkswagen and the local football federation to assist Italian migrant workers in Wolfsburg in acclimatising to their new environment and to provide a connection to their home country. Lupo was the first migrant workers' club in Germany and the first to enter competitive football; it was well supported, attracting more than 1,000 spectators to its home games in the local amateur leagues. Originally the club only played friendlies as clubs in the German league system could only field one foreigner per team; when these rules were changed for amateur teams, Lupo was allowed to enter competitive football.

In 1970 a second Italian-based club was formed in the city, US Martini, and the two quickly developed a strong rivalry. By then, Wolfsburg had a 12,000-strong Italian community. The two clubs eventually merged in 1981 to form the current Lupo Martini Wolfsburg. The club used the Platz an der Berliner Brücke as its home ground, nowadays the location of the Volkswagen Arena, home of Bundesliga club VfL Wolfsburg.

The club spent most of its footballing history in local amateur leagues, rising as high as the tier six Landesliga Braunschweig in the early 2000s. After relegation from this level in 2002, it returned in 2005. In 2009, it won promotion to the eastern division of the tier five Niedersachsenliga. Despite finishing in tenth place, Lupo Martini was relegated at the end of the season as the league was merged into a single division. The club spent two more seasons in the Landesliga before returning to the Niedersachsenliga in 2012.

In 2012–13 the club finished runners-up in the league and qualified for the promotion round to the Regionalliga Nord. Finishing third in its group, it missed out on promotion and stayed in the Niedersachsenliga, where it came third the season after and seventh in 2014–15. In the 2015–16 season the club won the Niedersachsenliga and earned promotion to the Regionalliga Nord. After an immediate relegation in 2016–17, it won the Niedersachsenliga again the following season to return to the Regionalliga Nord, but was relegated again in 2019.

Honours
The club's honours:
 Niedersachsenliga
 Champions: 2015–16, 2017–18
 Runners-up: 2012–13
 Landesliga Braunschweig
 Champions: 2011–12
 Runners-up: 2008–09

Recent seasons 
The recent season-by-season performance of the club:

 With the introduction of the Regionalligas in 1994 and the 3. Liga in 2008 as the new third tier, below the 2. Bundesliga, all leagues below dropped one tier.

References

External links 
 
Lupo Martini Wolfsburg at Weltfussball.de 

Wolfsburg Lup Martini
Football clubs in Lower Saxony
Association football clubs established in 1962
1962 establishments in West Germany
Wolfsburg
Migrant workers football clubs in Germany
Italian association football clubs outside Italy
Works association football clubs in Germany